HNLMS Jacob van Heemskerck (F812) was a frigate of the . The ship was in service with the Royal Netherlands Navy from 1986 to 2004. The frigate was named after Dutch naval hero Jacob van Heemskerck. The ship's radio call sign was "PAVO".

Dutch service history
HNLMS Jacob van Heemskerck was one of two s and was built at the KM de Schelde in Vlissingen. The keel laying took place on 21 January 1981 and the launching on 5 November 1983. The ship was put into service on 15 January 1986.

In the early 90s the ship participated in Operation Desert Storm.

After the September 11 attacks the ship became part of Standing Naval Force Atlantic (STANAVFORLANT) for which she was sent to the eastern parts of the Mediterranean Sea where she participated in operation Direct Endeavour.

In 2003 she served for five months as flagship of the Standing Naval Force Mediterranean (STANAVFORMED). She served as the flagship for STANAVFORLANT in 2004 for six months.

On 2 December 2004 the vessel was decommissioned was and sold to the Chilean Navy.

Chilean service history

The ship was put into service on 16 December 2005 where the ship was renamed Almirante Latorre using the radio call sign was "CCLT".

Notes

Jacob van Heemskerck-class frigates
Jacob van Heemskerck-class frigates of the Chilean Navy
1983 ships
Ships built in Vlissingen